Joseph Henry Fisher (July 4, 1916 – April 13, 2002) was a Canadian professional ice hockey player.

Early life 
Fisher was born in Medicine Hat, Alberta.

Career 
Fisher played 64 games in the National Hockey League with the Detroit Red Wings between 1939 and 1943. The rest of his career, which lasted from 1934 to 1949, was spent in the minor leagues.

Career statistics

Regular season and playoffs

External links
 
 Obituary at LostHockey.com
 

1916 births
2002 deaths
Canadian ice hockey right wingers
Detroit Red Wings players
Ice hockey people from Alberta
Indianapolis Capitals players
Sportspeople from Medicine Hat
Pittsburgh Hornets players